The 1946–47 Yugoslav First League season was the first season of the First Federal League, the top level association football competition of SFR Yugoslavia, which ended the six-year period in which national football competitions were suspended due to World War II. It was also the first season in which the Football Association of Yugoslavia (FSJ) introduced the modern league system which included promotion and relegation between tiers of the football pyramid, as pre-war national championships held between 1927 and 1940 during Kingdom of Yugoslavia employed either a play-off tournament or a mini league format contested by regional champions.

In 1946 both the First and Second Leagues began to use a season long derby to determine the league champion, and an elimination cup to feature a secondary cup champion. With Partizan dominating the league, and then winning the cup shortly after, they are the first ever "double champion" of the Yugoslav First League.

Teams

Notes
 During the season, FK Železničar Niš merged with two other Niš-based clubs, Jedinstvo and Radnički, to form 14. Oktobar.

League table

Results

Top scorers

References

Yugoslav First League seasons
Yugo
1946–47 in Yugoslav football